K. S. Gopalakrishnan was an Indian screenwriter, director, producer, and lyricist, who worked in Tamil, Malayalam and Hindi films. Since the early 1960s, he directed 70 films. He spent most of his career directing and producing movies with social and devotional themes. Most of his movies are melodramas. His son K. S. G. Venkatesh is an actor who has acted in television serials and in films like Sathuranga Vettai.

Career 
After serving the Nawab's troupe for about nineteen years in various capacities, K.S.G. joined Sri Devi Nataka Sabha where he wrote two successful plays entitled "POST-MAN" ,"THAMBI"(younger brother) and "EZHUTHALAN"(writer).

Namefellow 
K. S. Gopalakrishnan shared exactly the same name with an earlier director and actor who worked in Tamil cinema in the 1940s and 1950s. This Gopalakrishnan, who directed films produced by S. S. Vasan, did not achieve much cinematic success, and was often confused with the later Gopalakrishnan.

Death 
K. S. Gopalakrishnan died on 14 November 2015 at the age of 86.

Filmography

As director

As lyricist 
 Edhir Paradhathu (1954) - "Thinnu paarthu"
 Amaradeepam (1956) - "Naanayam Manushanukku"
 Engal Veettu Mahalakshmi (1957) - "Polladha Payalai", "Mannai Nambi Maram", "Purushan Sollai", "Kaathadi"
 Uthama Puthiran (1958) - "Kondattam Manasukkulle", "Un Azhagai Kanniyargal"
 Deivapiravi (1960) - "Kattadhathukku Manai", "Manidhanai Manidhan"
 Yugadharmam (1983)
 Padikkadha Pannaiyar (1985) - "Onnum Theriyatha"

As writer 
 Deivapiravi — 1960
 Naan Kanda Sorgam (Dialogues) — 1960
 Padikkadha Medhai (dialogue) — 1960
 Kairasi (story, screenplay, dialogue) — 1960
 Ellam Unakkaga (screenplay, dialogue) — 1961
 Kumudham (story, screenplay, dialogue) — 1961
 Annai (dialogue) — 1962
 Deivathin Deivam (dialogue/Screenplay) - 1962
 Bhavani (story, screenplay, dialogue) — 1967
 Sange Muzhangu - Written by – 1972
Uravukku Kai Koduppom - 1975
 Per Sollum Pillai (dialogue) — 1987

Awards 

National Film Awards
 1962 – Certificate of Merit for the Third Best Feature Film in Tamil - Sarada
 1963 – Certificate of Merit for the Second Best Feature Film in Tamil – Karpagam
 1964 – President's silver medal for Best Feature Film – Kai Kodutha Dheivam

Titles and other honours
 Kalaimamani in 1975

Tamil Nadu State Film Awards
 Tamil Nadu State Film Honorary Award - Arignar Anna Award in 1990

References

External links 
 
 The Traditional Face of Tamil Cinema in My Movie Minutes

Film directors from Tamil Nadu
1929 births
2015 deaths
People from Thanjavur district
20th-century Indian film directors
Tamil film directors
Tamil screenwriters
Tamil-language lyricists
Malayalam film directors
20th-century Indian dramatists and playwrights
Screenwriters from Tamil Nadu